Romy Bühler (born 23 September 1994 in Zürich) is a Swiss retired figure skater. She represented her country at the 2012 World Championships, two European Championships, and three World Junior Championships.

After eight years training under Linda van Troyen in Küsnacht, she switched to Evi Fehr at Winterthurer Schlittschuh-Club in 2011.

Programs

Competitive highlights 
JGP: Junior Grand Prix

References

External links 

Romy Bühler at Figure Skating Online
 

1994 births
Living people
Figure skaters from Zürich
Swiss female single skaters